Side Pawn Capture Pawn*23 (横歩取り☖2三歩 yokofudori ni-san fu) or Side Pawn Capture B*25 (横歩取り☖2五角 yokofudori ni-go kaku) is variation stemming from the Side Pawn Capture opening, in which White drops a pawn on the second file before trading off pawns on the eighth file leading Black to capture White's Side Pawn. After this, White initiates a rapid attack against Black's rook starting from a bishop drop on the second file.

This is an older variation of the Side Pawn opening that has become disfavored since White's rapid attack is considered ineffective.

Development

6...P*23. White drops their pawn in hand on the 23 square attacking Black's rook – a striking pawn tactic.

7. Rx34. Fleeing from attack, Black can now take White's side pawn.

Rapid Attack

White's primary response to Black's capturing of the side pawn has been to immediately trade bishops and attack Black's vulnerable rook.

B*25

B*45

See also

 Side Pawn Capture
 Static Rook

Bibliography

External links

Shogi openings
Side Pawn Capture openings